Binjimen Victor (born January 15, 1997) is an American football wide receiver who is a free agent. He played college football at Ohio State.

Early life and high school
Victor grew up in Pompano Beach, Florida and attended Coconut Creek High School. As a senior, Victor caught 42 passes for 846 yards and 15 touchdowns and played in the 2016 All-American Bowl. Victor was rated a four-star recruit and committed to play college football at Ohio State over offers from Tennessee and West Virginia.

College career
Victor was a member of the Ohio State Buckeyes for four seasons. As a true freshman, he played in five games with four reception for 64 yards and one touchdown. He caught 23 passes for 349 yards and was second on the team with seven touchdown receptions in his sophomore season. Victor caught 21 passes for 354 yards and four touchdowns as a junior. He scored a touchdown on a three yard reception with 40 seconds left to force overtime in a 52–51 win over Maryland. As a senior, he had 35 receptions for 573 yards and six touchdowns. Victor finished his collegiate career with 83 receptions for 1,340 yards and 18 touchdowns, tied for the tenth-most in Buckeyes history.

Professional career

New York Giants
Victor signed with the New York Giants as an undrafted free agent on April 25, 2020, shortly after the conclusion of the 2020 NFL Draft. He was waived on September 5, 2020 and signed to the practice squad the next day. His practice squad contract with the team expired after the season on January 11, 2021.

Baltimore Ravens
On January 15, 2021, Victor signed a reserve/futures contract with the Baltimore Ravens. He was waived on August 31, 2021 and re-signed to the practice squad the next day. He signed a reserve/future contract with the Ravens on January 10, 2022.

On August 30, 2022, Victor was waived by the Ravens and signed to the practice squad the next day. On January 14, 2023 Victor was promoted to Baltimore's active roster for their playoff game versus the Cincinnati Bengals.

References

External links
New York Giants bio
Ohio State Buckeyes bio

1997 births
Living people
American football wide receivers
Ohio State Buckeyes football players
Players of American football from Florida
Sportspeople from Broward County, Florida
People from Pompano Beach, Florida
New York Giants players
Baltimore Ravens players